Spencer Airport,  in Spencer, Massachusetts, is a public airport which was once owned by Gregg E. Andrews.  It has one runway, averages 125 flights per week, and has approximately 26 aircraft based on its field. Andrews Aviation, based at the airport provides flight instruction in a vintage Piper J-3 Cub.

References

External links
Official website

Airports in Worcester County, Massachusetts
Spencer, Massachusetts